Oron Museum is a museum in Oron, Nigeria. The museum was established in 1958 to accommodate eight hundred known ancestral figures (Ekpu Oro) of the Oron people which are believed to be among the oldest and finest surviving wood carvings in Africa. During the civil war, many of the wood carvings were looted and the museum was severely damaged. In 1975, the museum was reinaugurated and today houses the remains of the wooden sculptures and other ethnographic materials from across Nigeria. The museum also has displays of bunkers used during the civil war as well as a crafts village.

References

Oron people
Museums in Nigeria
Museums established in 1958
Akwa Ibom State
20th-century architecture in Nigeria